Juan Pablo Brzezicki and David Marrero were the defending champions, but only Argentinian player tried to defend his title.He partnered with Santiago Ventura, but they lost to Carlos Berlocq and Brian Dabul in the semifinals.Berlocq and Dabul went on to win the tournament after defeating Máximo González and Sebastián Prieto 7–5, 6–3 in the final.

Seeds

Draw

Draw

References
 Doubles Draw

Copa Petrobras Montevideo - Doubles
2010 Doubles
2010 in Uruguayan tennis